Sea Lion Tarn is a freshwater tarn with an area of  located between Sea Lion Glacier and the north-western slopes of Atlantic Club Ridge on Hurd Peninsula in eastern Livingston Island in the South Shetland Islands, Antarctica.  The lake drains westward through a 100 m creek into South Bay.

The feature takes its name from the adjacent Sea Lion Glacier.

Location

Maps
 L.L. Ivanov. Livingston Island: Central-Eastern Region. Scale 1:25000 topographic map.  Sofia: Antarctic Place-names Commission of Bulgaria, 1996.
 L.L. Ivanov et al. Antarctica: Livingston Island and Greenwich Island, South Shetland Islands. Scale 1:100000 topographic map. Sofia: Antarctic Place-names Commission of Bulgaria, 2005.
 L.L. Ivanov. Antarctica: Livingston Island and Greenwich, Robert, Snow and Smith Islands. Scale 1:120000 topographic map.  Troyan: Manfred Wörner Foundation, 2009.  
 Antarctic Digital Database (ADD). Scale 1:250000 topographic map of Antarctica. Scientific Committee on Antarctic Research (SCAR). Since 1993, regularly updated.
 L.L. Ivanov. Antarctica: Livingston Island and Smith Island. Scale 1:100000 topographic map. Manfred Wörner Foundation, 2017.

References
 Sea Lion Tarn. SCAR Composite Antarctic Gazetteer
 Bulgarian Antarctic Gazetteer. Antarctic Place-names Commission. (details in Bulgarian, basic data in English)

External links
 Sea Lion Tarn. Copernix satellite image

Bodies of water of Livingston Island

Lakes of the South Shetland Islands